CentrePort Canada is a tri-modal dry port and Foreign Trade Zone located partly in northwest Winnipeg, Manitoba (CentrePort South) and partly in the Rural Municipality of Rosser (CentrePort North), and situated adjacent to the Winnipeg James Armstrong Richardson International Airport (YWG). With  of industrial land, it is the largest tri-modal inland port and foreign trade zone in North America.

The port provides access to tri-modal transportation: (1) rail—three Class I railways, specifically Canadian National (CNR), Canadian Pacific (CPR), and BNSF Railway; (2) air—a 24/7 international air cargo airport; and (3) road—an international trucking hub. CentrePort also offers greenfield investment opportunities for a wide variety of business operations, including distribution, warehousing, and manufacturing. The portion of the inland port that falls within Rosser has access to a Special Planning Area to streamline the land development approval process.

Located near the geographic centre of North America, it serves as a hub for national and international trading corridors, as well as attracting new transportation logistics development to the city area. Moreover, Winnipeg has direct connections to both of Canada's only major Pacific ports, Port of Vancouver and the Port of Prince Rupert, as well as a direct connection to Churchill, Manitoba, a major grain export facility and the only Canadian deep-water Arctic port.

Governance 

CentrePort Canada was created in 2008 by provincial legislation called the CentrePort Canada Act, which established its mandate and designated land to the port. The Act also defines the structure of the board of directors and includes nominees from 11 nominating organizations and 4 directors at large.

Since then, CentrePort has worked closely with related departments of the Manitoba government, including Manitoba Infrastructure and Transportation, Department of Economic Development and Jobs, Manitoba Municipal Relations, and Manitoba Agriculture and Resource Development. Under The Planning Act, the portion of the inland port that falls within Rosser is a Special Planning Area, wherein land usage is guided by the Inland Port Special Planning Areas Regulation 49/2016 (Development Plan and Zoning By-law). The planning authority for lands within this area is the provincial Minister of Indigenous and Municipal Relations.

CentrePort has also engaged with several federal departments, including Western Economic Diversification, Transport Canada, Global Affairs, and International Development.

CentrePort is now one among a growing number of inland terminals in North America and faces competition from other prairie centres, such as Port Alberta in Metro Edmonton and the Global Transportation Hub in Regina, Saskatchewan.

Marketing partners of CentrePort include (among others):

 Aboriginal Chamber of Commerce
 Assiniboia Chamber of Commerce
 Bockstael Construction
 Business Council of Manitoba
 Business Development Bank of Canada (BDC)
 Cushman & Wakefield I Stevenson
 Economic Development Winnipeg
 Manitoba Chambers of Commerce
 Manitoba Real Estate Association
 Manitoba Trucking Association
 Motel 6 Winnipeg West
 Prairie Rail Solutions
 Super 8 Winnipeg West
 Thompson Dorfman Sweatman LLP
 United Way Winnipeg
 Winnipeg Chamber of Commerce
 Winnipeg Metro Region
 World Trade Centre Winnipeg

Operations 
CentrePort Canada provides access to tri-modal transportation:

 three Class I railways, specifically Canadian National (CNR), Canadian Pacific (CPR), and BNSF Railway;
 a 24/7 international air cargo airport (James Armstrong Richardson International); and
 an international trucking hub, which includes two of Canada’s largest companies—Bison Transport and TransX.

CentrePort also offers greenfield investment opportunities for a wide variety of business operations, including distribution, warehousing, and manufacturing.

CentrePort also has partnerships with post-secondary institutions, namely Red River College (RRC) and Manitoba Institute of Trades & Technology. For agribusiness, there are specialized industry training programs at the University of Manitoba (Faculty of Agriculture and Food Sciences/ Transport Institute), University of Winnipeg (Richardson College for Environment and Science), and RRC (Paterson GlobalFoods Institute).

The portion of CentrePort Canada within the Rural Municipality of Rosser has been established as the "Inland Port Special Planning Area," wherein land use is regulated by the Development Plan and Zoning By-law, helping to expedite planning and the land-development approval process.

In 2020, CentrePort Canada announced a new project to be completed by the end of 2021: InkSport Business Park, a $65-million, 68-acre industrial park built by Whiteland Developers.

Location 
Located near the geographic centre of North America, Winnipeg—therefore CentrePort—serves as a hub for national and international trading corridors, as well as attracting new transportation logistics development to the city area. Winnipeg has connections to both of Canada's only major Pacific ports, Port of Vancouver and the Port of Prince Rupert, in addition to a direct connection to Churchill, Manitoba, a major grain export facility and the only Canadian deep-water Arctic port.

CentrePort Canada is therefore located at the hub of key economic gateways.

Companies and industry sectors 
CentrePort's  is principal for any degree of development and is particularly beneficial for six key industry sectors:

 Agribusiness & food processing
 Advanced & composites manufacturing
 Biomedical/biotechnology
 E-commerce
 Energy & mines
 Transportation & logistics

Since its inception, 100 new companies have chosen to locate at the inland port and CentrePort has 2000 acres in active development. CentrePort is home to various mining and heavy equipment manufacturers & suppliers including, ISCO Industries, SMS Equipment, and Cassidy Manufacturing.

Regarding the transportation and logistics sector, CentrePort is home to two of Canada’s largest companies, Bison Transport and TransX; houses operations for Gardewine, Payne Transport, Paul’s Hauling, Meyers Bros Trucking, 4Tracks Ltd., etc.; and houses new facilities by FedEx, Freight Canada, Pacific Coast Express, and Rosedale Transport.

New company facilities at CentrePort include:

 a pea and canola protein processing plant (94,000 sqft) of Merit Functional Foods;
 a distribution centre (100,000 sqft) of Groupe Touchette, which is the largest Canadian-owned tire distribution company;
 a $1.45 million plant of Eautopia Biological Technology that produces custom bottles, labels, and beverages;
 140,000 sqft facility expansion to Rosenau Transport, which is one of Western Canada's largest regional carriers;
 $8-million agricultural hub of Imperial Seed.

Winnipeg Airports Authority Campus 
The freight terminal of Winnipeg James Armstrong Richardson International Airport (IATA: YWG, ICAO: CYWG) is part of the CentrePort Canada dry port, offering 24/7 worldwide air cargo operations. YWG is ranked #1 in all of Canada for "dedicated freighter aircraft movements."

Major carriers on site include Air Canada Cargo, Canada Post, Cargojet, FedEx, Purolator, and UPS. Moreover, Manitoba holds the 3rd largest aerospace industry in Canada, including Air Canada, which is located at CentrePort, on the Winnipeg Airports Authority Campus.

CentrePort Canada Way 
As Winnipeg is located near the geographic centre of North America, it serves as a hub for national and international trading corridors, as well as attracting new transportation logistics development to the city area.

Plans to build CentrePort Canada Way was announced on 14 April 2009, when Prime Minister Stephen Harper with Manitoba Premier Gary Doer declared at James Richardson Airport that both the federal and provincial governments would contribute CA$212.5 million towards a divided four-lane expressway. In March 2014, the Province of Manitoba announced that it would double CentrePort Canada Way to bypass the Rural Municipality of Headingley and connect directly into the TransCanada Highway (PTH 1). The expressway subsequently opened in November 2013.

The expressway is also situated within about $1 billion in supporting highway infrastructure.

CentrePort Canada Rail Park 
Winnipeg is the only major Canadian city on the prairies served by three continental class I railways: Canadian National (CNR), Canadian Pacific (CPR), and BNSF Railway.

The Rail Park is currently in development and, when complete, will provide rail serviced industrial land for companies engaged in global supply chain activities. The Rail Park is intended to further enhance access to the three Class I rail carriers that are already provided by CentrePort, with CPR and CNR in particular operating significant intermodal yards in Winnipeg.

References

External links
 CentrePort Canada website
CentrePort Land Use map

Ports and harbours of Manitoba
Dry ports of Canada
2008 establishments in Manitoba